Sui Prefecture may refer to:
Suizhou (隨州), a prefecture-level city in Hubei, a prefecture since the 6th century
Suizhou (in modern Shaanxi) (綏州), a prefecture between the 6th and 11th centuries

See also
Sui (disambiguation)